Darren Chan (born 20 September 1996, in Kuantan) is a Malaysian professional squash player. As of October 2019, he was ranked number 144 in the world. He won the 2018 Cairns Squash International professional PSA tournament.

References

1996 births
Living people
Malaysian male squash players